James Margrave Perry was South Carolina's first female lawyer.

Perry, a third daughter, was born on May 10, 1894 in Greenville, South Carolina to James Margrave Perry and Jean Victoria Le Gal. Referred to as "Miss Jim", she was named after her father (a stenography and accounting teacher at Greenville Female College) who had wanted a son to carry on his name. Perry was home schooled by her mother before entering the Greenville Female College in 1909. She graduated with a B.A. in 1913 and went on to earn her Juris Doctor from the University of California, Berkeley in 1917. She was automatically admitted into the State Bar of California.

Perry returned to South Carolina, and became the first female registered on May 3, 1918 to practice law in South Carolina following Governor Richard I. Manning signing a bill that gave women the opportunity to do so. She started working at Haynsworth & Haynsworth and was named as a partner in 1937. This was a historical achievement, as no other South Carolinian female lawyer at the time had been named a partner. In 1955, she became the one of the first women in the United States to chair a local bar association when she became the President of the Greenville Bar Association.

Perry died on April 19, 1964 in Greenville, South Carolina.

See also 

 List of first women lawyers and judges in South Carolina

References 

South Carolina lawyers
1894 births
1964 deaths
20th-century American women lawyers
20th-century American lawyers